The 2020 Coupe de la Ligue Final decided the winner of the 2019–20 Coupe de la Ligue, the 26th and last edition of France's football league cup competition, the Coupe de la Ligue, contested by the 44 teams that the Ligue de Football Professionnel (LFP) manages. The final was originally scheduled for 4 April 2020 but was postponed due to the COVID-19 pandemic in France. The final took place at the Stade de France in Saint-Denis, and was contested by Paris Saint-Germain and Lyon.

As the LFP voted in September 2019 to abolish the Coupe de la Ligue for the following season, the match was the last in the competition's history.

On 28 April 2020, Prime Minister Édouard Philippe announced all sporting events in France would be cancelled until September. On 26 June, the LFP announced that the final was rescheduled to 31 July.

Paris Saint-Germain won the final 6–5 on penalties over Lyon, following a 0–0 draw after extra time, for their ninth Coupe de la Ligue title.

Route to the final
Note: In all results below, the score of the finalist is given first (H: home; A: away).

Match

Details

Notes

References

External links
 
 

2020
2019–20 in French football
Paris Saint-Germain F.C. matches
Olympique Lyonnais matches
Sport in Saint-Denis, Seine-Saint-Denis
Football competitions in Paris
Association football events postponed due to the COVID-19 pandemic
July 2020 sports events in France
2020 in Paris
Association football penalty shoot-outs